Michael A. Casey is James Wright Professor  of Music at Dartmouth College, where he is also the Chair of the Department of Music.

He was educated at Lutterworth College, the University of East Anglia where he received a BA in music, at Dartmouth College where he received an MA in music, and at the Massachusetts Institute of Technology where he completed his PhD in media arts and sciences in 1998. He was previously Professor of Computer Science at Goldsmiths, University of London, where he directed the Media Futures Laboratory. He has an h-index of 32 according to Google Scholar.

References

Living people
Alumni of the University of East Anglia
Dartmouth College alumni
Massachusetts Institute of Technology alumni
Dartmouth College faculty
Academics of Goldsmiths, University of London
British musicologists
People educated at Lutterworth College
Year of birth missing (living people)